Patissa percnopis is a moth in the family Crambidae. It was described by Edward Meyrick in 1933. It is found in the Democratic Republic of the Congo, where it has been recorded from Katanga.

References

Moths described in 1933
Schoenobiinae